Events from the year 1777 in Scotland.

Incumbents

Law officers 
 Lord Advocate – Henry Dundas; 
 Solicitor General for Scotland – Alexander Murray

Judiciary 
 Lord President of the Court of Session – Lord Arniston, the younger
 Lord Justice General – Duke of Queensberry
 Lord Justice Clerk – Lord Barskimming

Events 
 21 June – Encyclopædia Britannica Second Edition begins publication in Edinburgh.
 11 September – first minister ordained to United Presbyterian Church, Thurso; first church building opens this year.
 73rd (Highland) Regiment of Foot (MacLeod's Highlanders) raised.
 Erskine Ferry established.

Births 
 22 January – Joseph Hume, army surgeon and radical politician (died 1855 in London)
 3 February – John Cheyne, physician (died 1836 in England)
 24 June – John Ross, naval officer and Arctic explorer (died 1856 in London)
 26 July – Robert Hamilton Bishop, Presbyterian minister and educator (died 1855 in the United States)
 27 July – Thomas Campbell, poet (died 1844 in France)
 21 December – John Campbell, 7th Duke of Argyll, peer and Whig politician (born in London; died 1847)

Deaths 
 3 January – William Leslie, British Army captain (born 1751; killed at Battle of Princeton)
 12 January – Hugh Mercer, surgeon and American Continental Army brigadier general (born 1726; died of injuries received at Battle of Princeton)
 13 January – James Rait, Episcopalian Bishop of Brechin since 1742 (born 1689)
 23 March – Sir Hugh Paterson, 2nd Baronet, Jacobite (born 1685)
 7 October – Simon Fraser of Balnain, British Army general (born 1729 in Scotland; killed at Battle of Bemis Heights)

Sport 
 Fraserburgh Golf Club established.
 Wanlockhead curling club established.

See also 

Timeline of Scottish history

References 

 
Years of the 18th century in Scotland
Scotland
1770s in Scotland